

White Hut is a locality in the Australian state of South Australia. Its boundaries were created in May 1999. As of 2014, the majority of the land within the locality is zoned as “water protection” to protect groundwater basins present at “shallow depths” and to encourage land use such as “broadacre cropping, grazing, and wind farm and ancillary development.” White Hut is within the federal division of Grey, the state electoral district of Narungga and the local government area of the Yorke Peninsula Council.

See also
List of cities and towns in South Australia

References

Towns in South Australia
Yorke Peninsula